Satluj De Kandhe, also spelled as Satluj De Kande, is a 1964 National Award winning Punjabi romantic film directed by M. M. Billoo Mehra and produced by Padam Prakash Maheshwary. It stars Balraj Sahni and Nishi. The movie was a major hit and was also broadcast thrice on Doordarshan, the public television network of India. Hansraj Behl composed the music. The film won the National Film Award for Best Feature Film in Punjabi.

See also 
Kankan De Ohle
Bhangra (film)
Lachhi (1949 film)
Kaude Shah
Do Lachhian
Mama Ji

References 

1964 films
Punjabi-language Indian films
Indian black-and-white films
1960s Punjabi-language films
Best Punjabi Feature Film National Film Award winners